The Pharmacist is an American true crime documentary series produced by The Cinemart. It released in February 2020 on Netflix, the series relates the efforts of Dan Schneider (activist), a small-town pharmacist in Poydras, Louisiana, to identify his son's killer and how this led to his gathering evidence against a prolific "pill mill" doctor in New Orleans.

Episodes

Reception
Review aggregator Rotten Tomatoes reported an approval rating of 89% based on 9 reviews, with an average rating of 8/10 for the miniseries.

See also
Opioid epidemic in the United States

References

Further reading

External links 
 
  
 

2020 American television series debuts
2020 American television series endings
2020s American documentary television series
Netflix original documentary television series
Documentary television series about crime in the United States
True crime television series
Opioids in the United States
English-language Netflix original programming
Television shows set in Louisiana